CapitalG Management Company LLC (formerly Google Capital) is the independent growth fund under Alphabet Inc. Founded in 2013, it focuses on larger, growth-stage technology companies, and invests for profit rather than strategically for Google. In addition to capital investment, CapitalG's approach includes giving portfolio companies access to Google's people, knowledge, and culture to support the companies' growth and offer them guidance.

History 
The fund began operating in 2013 but was only officially unveiled on February 19, 2014. The firm operates out of the Ferry Building in San Francisco. Following the Alphabet restructure, Google Capital was renamed as CapitalG on November 4, 2016.

Team 
CapitalG is led by managing partner Laela Sturdy. It was founded in 2013 by David Lawee, formerly Google's Vice President of Corporate Development, and before that, Google's first Vice President of Marketing. Lawee was joined by partners Gene Frantz (formerly a partner at private equity firm TPG), Laela Sturdy (now managing partner; before joining CapitalG she was a Managing Director of Emerging Businesses at Google), Derek Zanutto (formerly at TPG, Hellman & Friedman and GIC) and Jesse Wedler (who joined CapitalG in 2013 out of Stanford business school).

CapitalG also comprises over 50 advisors from senior positions within Google, who offer portfolio companies guidance in business areas such as data science, engineering, marketing, and product management.

Investments

Relationship to GV 
CapitalG focuses on later-stage and growth equity investments, while GV invests in companies across all stages and industries. Another corporate division, Google's Corporate Development group, does acquisitions and investments that are strategic for Google's products and business.

References

External links

CapitalG on Index

Private equity firms of the United States
Companies based in Mountain View, California
Alphabet Inc.
American companies established in 2013
Financial services companies established in 2013
Alphabet Inc. subsidiaries